The Spirit Indestructible Tour was the fifth concert tour by Canadian singer-songwriter Nelly Furtado, in support of her fifth studio album, The Spirit Indestructible (2012).

Background
The tour was announced on November 13, 2012 via Furtado's official website. The tour suffered from low ticket sales and several shows were cancelled and several shows had to be moved to smaller venues. In place of the cancelled shows, smaller shows were announced for Burlington and Belleville. Only 2,353 people were in attendance opening night in Victoria. The opening act is Dylan Murray, an artist from Furtado's label Nelstar Records. Murray also duets live with Furtado on the track "Be OK".

Ahead of the tour's debut in Furtado's hometown of Victoria, local radio station Ocean 98.5 held a contest offering tickets to the first show. The Huffington Post Canada held contests for free tickets throughout the tour's Canadian dates. Mississauga News held a contest for free tickets to the Toronto show.

Critical reception
Mike Devlin of the Times Colonist reviewed the first date of the tour and gave the show three stars out of five. Devlin wrote, "A mid-set run that included a faithful but lovely I’m Like a Bird and an empowered Força, during which she played ukulele, reminded fans why she became so famous in the first place. But few songs on this night could match the splendour of her most moving ballad, Try, during which her voice was nothing short of spectacular. “All I know,” she sang during the song, “is everything is not as it’s sold.” That much is true — about life, and about Furtado, too. Think she’s simply a pop star? Think again." The Vancouver Sun gave the concert a mixed review, writing that the concert "opened on an uplifting, hopeful note" but that the "rest of the concert was laborious". Marsha Lederman of The Globe and Mail was equally mixed, stating that "[Furtado] still has the vocal chops and stage presence, but the show was uneven".

Opening acts
Dylan Murray (North America)
Jessica Tyler (North America)
Celia Palli (Europe)

Setlist
The following setlist is obtained from the concert held on January 24, 2013, at the Sony Centre for the Performing Arts in Toronto, Canada. It does not represent all songs performed on tour. 
"Spirit Indestructible"
"Waiting for the Night"
"Say It Right"
"Do It"
"Powerless (Say What You Want)"
"Try"
"Don’t Leave This Love" (performed with Dylan Murray)
"Quando, Quando, Quando"
"Get Ur Freak On" / "Turn Off the Light"
"I'm Like a Bird"
"Fly Like an Eagle"
"Força"
"All Good Things (Come to an End)"
"Bucket List"
"Parking Lot"
"Big Hoops (Bigger the Better)"
"High Life"
"Give It to Me" / "Promiscuous"
Encore
"Miracles"
"Like a Prayer"
"Maneater"

Tour dates

Festivals and other miscellaneous performances
This concert was a private show for the sponsorship between Canadian Tire and Canadian Olympic committee.
Caprices Festival Crans-Montana

Cancellations and rescheduled shows

Box office score data

External links
 Nelly Furtado's official site

References

Nelly Furtado concert tours
2013 concert tours